Kamenar is a surname. Notable people with the surname include:

Karlo Kamenar (born 1994), Croatian footballer
Ľuboš Kamenár (born 1987), Slovak footballer

Surnames of Polish origin